The 1986 United States Senate election in Iowa was held November 4, 1986. Incumbent Republican United States Senator Chuck Grassley won re-election to a second term, defeating Democratic nominee, attorney John P. Roehrick in a landslide.

Democratic primary

Candidates
 John P. Roehrick, attorney
 Juan Cortez

Results

Republican primary

Candidates
 Chuck Grassley, incumbent United States Senator

Results

General election

Results

See also 
 1986 United States Senate elections

References 

Iowa
1986
1986 Iowa elections